Sarah Jio (born February 18, 1978) is an American journalist and New York Times bestselling author of 11 novels.

Early life and education
Jio was born on 18 February 1978 in Seattle, Washington. She began writing as a child and was the first teenage columnist for her local newspaper, The Bremerton Sun. Later, Jio earned a bachelor's degree in journalism from Western Washington University.

Career
Jio started her career in 2000 as an account executive at The Silver Company before becoming an editor at Seattle Pacific University, where she worked for ten years. Simultaneously she also worked as a freelance writer contributing articles on topics covering travel, nutrition, food, health and psychology to many national magazines and newspapers.

In 2008, Jio became a contributor to Glamour magazine, where she penned the publication's popular health blog, "Vitamin G", and later wrote a weekly column about her life after divorce.

In 2010, Jio signed with Penguin Random House, and has since published 11 novels with this international publishing company including the New York Times and USA Today bestseller, Blackberry Winter. Her novels are published in more than 30 countries worldwide and have been translated into dozens of languages. Jio is also a frequent contributor to the actress Molly Sims' lifestyle website.

Books

Personal life
Jio currently lives in Seattle with her husband, Brandon Ebel, the founder of Tooth and Nail Records and her three sons and three step children.

References

1978 births
Living people
Writers from Seattle
Western Washington University alumni
21st-century American journalists
21st-century American novelists
21st-century American women writers
American columnists